Francisco Javier Esteche Sosa (born 12 November 1973), known as Francisco Esteche, is a Paraguayan footballer currently playing for General Caballero of the Primera División in Paraguay.

Teams
 Sportivo Luqueño 1991–1994
 Olimpia 1995–2005
 Guaraní 2006
 Macará 2007
 12 de Octubre 2007–2008
 Jorge Wilstermann 2009
 Sportivo Luqueño 2009–2011
 General Caballero 2011–present

Career statistics

International goals

Notes

References

External links
 
 

1973 births
Living people
Paraguayan footballers
Paraguayan expatriate footballers
Paraguay international footballers
1995 Copa América players
Sportivo Luqueño players
Club Olimpia footballers
Club Guaraní players
C.S.D. Macará footballers
12 de Octubre Football Club players
C.D. Jorge Wilstermann players
General Caballero Sport Club footballers
Expatriate footballers in Bolivia
Expatriate footballers in Ecuador
Association football midfielders